The following lists events that happened during 1935 in South Africa.

Incumbents
 Monarch: King George V.
 Governor-General and High Commissioner for Southern Africa: The Earl of Clarendon.
 Prime Minister: James Barry Munnik Hertzog.
 Chief Justice: John Wessels.

Events
February
 1 – The South African Airways takes over the South West African Airways which has been providing a weekly airmail service between Windhoek and Kimberley since 1932.

Unknown date
 Cape Town begins to reclaim 480 acres (1.9 km2) of land on the Foreshore.

Births
 30 January – Albie Sachs, activist and a former judge on the Constitutional Court of South Africa.
 5 February – Johannes Geldenhuys, military commander (d. 2018)
 5 March – Durant Sihlali, artist, in Germiston. (d. 2004)
 22 April – Mac Maharaj, political activist, in Newcastle, KwaZulu-Natal.
 29 April – Tom van Vollenhoven, Springbok rugby player.
 29 May – André P. Brink, Sestiger author, in Vrede. (d. 2015)
 23 August – Sol Kerzner, business magnate, founder of Southern Sun Hotel Group, Sun International & Kerzner International (d. 2020)
 30 August – Peter Cartwright (actor), actor
 1 November – Gary Player, professional golfer.
 11 November – Esther Mahlangu, artist from the Ndebele nation, bold large-scale contemporary paintings that reference her Ndebele heritage

Deaths
 28 March – Tielman Roos, politician and Minister of Justice. (b. 1879)
 2 November – Jock Cameron, South African cricketer. (b. 1905)
 20 May – Nontetha, Xhosa prophet

Railways

Railway lines opened
 19 October – Transvaal – Springs to Kaydale, .

Locomotives
Four new Cape gauge locomotive types enter service on the South African Railways (SAR), all with rotary cam poppet valve gear:
 The first of forty-four Class 15E 4-8-2 Mountain type locomotives.
 Six Class 16E  Pacific type passenger steam locomotives.
 Fifty Class 19C  Mountain type locomotives.
 A single experimental Class 20  Santa Fe type locomotive.

Sports

Cricket
 2 July – The South African cricket team wins its first test cricket match against the English cricket team at Lord's Cricket Ground.

References

 
1930s in South Africa
South Africa
Years of the 20th century in South Africa
South Africa